Ooops! Noah Is Gone... (also known as All Creatures Big and Small in the United States and Two by Two in the United Kingdom and Ireland) is a 2015 3D computer-animated adventure comedy film directed by Toby Genkel and co-directed by Sean McCormack based on an idea by Ralph Christians about what happened to the creatures that missed Noah's Ark.

A sequel, Ooops! 2: The Adventure Continues... (alternative title Two by Two: Overboard!), was released on July 21, 2022.

Plot 
Set in the Genesis flood narrative, Dave is a Nestrian, a brightly coloured aardvark-like creature whose only skills seems to be making comfortable nests and secreting a foul-smelling cloud of blue gas whenever he gets emotional. Dave is constantly moving around searching for a place to stay, a real home, much to the despair of Finny, his son, who only wants to make friends. After hearing a rumor of a flood  that is said to cover the whole world, Dave packs up again and takes Finny to the gathering of other animals where their only salvation awaits: an ark huge enough to fit in all the animals of the world. With their use of some creative thinking, some Nestrian craftsmanship, and the involuntary help of Hazel and her daughter Leah, who are panther-like creatures called Grymps, they manage to sneak on the ark after all.

Just when the day seemed to have been saved, Dave and Hazel realize that Finny and Leah have disappeared. Their curiosity having gotten the better of them, they were on the scaffolding as the tidal wave hit the boat and it sailed away. Their parents panic as the ark sails away, leaving their children stranded on the last bit of land not yet engulfed by the water. Their desperate race against time begins. Leah, who is a born hunter is burdened with the clumsy and awkward Finny. Somehow, they manage to escape from the rising water, but the Griffins a couple of flying foxes. Eventually add two more animals who were also rejected from the ark to their ranks, as they meet Obesey the whale and his companion who is a squid-like parasite called Stayput. Finding his footing, surrounded by his new group of friends, Finny starts to emerge as the brave hero that he really is.

Meanwhile, their parents must get over their differences to work together, fight their way through gorilla guards and the egotistical Lion Captain to take control of the ark and save them. Having had many adventures, the "Fearless Four" manage to fight the continuing attacks of two Griffins who see Leah and Finny as their dinner. Eventually, the griffins and Obesey fall into the rising water along with Stayput. As the water reaches the top of the mountain where Leah and Finny are, the parents manage to take control of the ark and steer it to the mountaintop.

When the ark passes through a iceberg, it turns out to be hard to climb on. Finny first manages to climb on the ark, but he does not want to leave Leah behind and jumps back on the iceberg. Then Leah jumps on board of the ark and uses her sharp claws to hold on. Finny tries to get back on the ark too, but falls in the water, seemingly unconscious or dying. When Dave tries to save Finny from drowning in the water, the plot twist is revealed: Nestrians are actually aquatic animals, perfectly able to breathe and swim while submerged. This also explains why Dave was never feeling at home. As the Griffins later chases Finny, but Obesey later appears and eats them, with Dave and Finny swim alongside the ark, waving at Leah and Hazel. On the deck of the ark, the Lion Captain and his flamingo assistant discuss whether they should have told Dave and Finny in the beginning they belong in the sea.

In the credits, the Ark stops at the Mount Ararat and when all the animals leave the Ark, and the Dave and Finny discover Nestrians in the sea. It also includes Finny and Dave teaching Leah and Hazel how to swim, while the Griffins play a game of cards near a stack of fish inside Obesey's stomach.

Cast 
 Callum Maloney as Finny
 Ava Connolly as Leah
 Dermot Magennis as Dave, Mr Griffin and Prairie Dog
 Tara Flynn as Hazel 
 Paul Tylak as Obesey and Stayput
 Aileen Mythen as Mrs. Griffin, Flamingo, Mrs. Gorilla and Margaret
 Alan Stanford as Lion Captain
 Patrick FitzSymones as Tanglefoot, Mr. Gorilla and Siberian Tiger

Reception

Box Office 
The film has grossed  at the Chinese box office.

Critical reception 
The film has a 36% rating on Rotten Tomatoes with an average rating of 4.5/10, making the reception of the film on the website negative. However, there is no Critic Consensus rating yet.

References

External links 

 
 
 

2015 3D films
2015 computer-animated films
2015 animated films
2015 films
2015 comedy films
Animated comedy films
Animated films about animals
Animated films about lions
Belgian animated films
Belgian children's films
Belgian comedy films
Films about father–son relationships
Films about bats
Films about whales
English-language German films
English-language Belgian films
English-language Irish films
English-language Luxembourgian films
German animated films
German children's films
German comedy films
Noah's Ark in film
Irish animated films
Irish comedy films
Luxembourgian animated films
3D animated films
Films directed by Toby Genkel
2010s English-language films
Irish children's films
2010s German films